The 1986 IAAF World Women's Road Race Championships was the fourth edition of the annual international road running competition organised by the International Amateur Athletics Federation (IAAF). The competition was hosted by Portugal on 9 November 1986 in Lisbon and featured one race only: a 15K run for women. There were individual and team awards available, with the national team rankings being decided by the combined finishing positions of a team's top three runners. Countries with fewer than three finishers were not ranked.

The race was won by Portugal's Aurora Cunha in a championship record time of 48:31 minutes, completing a successful defence of her titles from 1984 and 1985. Her teammate Rosa Mota finished four seconds in arrears for second place, narrowly pushing Carla Beurskens of the Netherlands in the bronze medal spot by a margin of one second. The Soviet Union won the team race, courtesy of Tatyana Kazankina, Lyudmila Matveyeva and Marina Rodchenkova, who all finished in the top ten. Cunha and Mota were joined by Albertina Dias to bring Portugal second in the team rankings, two points clear of the Marty Cooksey-led American team.

Results

Individual

Team

References

1986
IAAF World Women's Road Race Championships
IAAF World Women's Road Race Championships
IAAF World Women's Road Race Championships
Sport in Lisbon
AAF World Women's Road Race Championships, 1986
International athletics competitions hosted by Portugal
AAF World Road Race Championships
IAAF World Women's Road Race Championships